The 1936 International cricket season was from April 1936 to August 1936.

Season overview

June

Ireland in Scotland

India in England

July

England in Netherlands

References

1936 in cricket